The San Antonio Spurs are a professional basketball team based in San Antonio that competes in the National Basketball Association (NBA). In 1967, the franchise was founded in Dallas, Texas as the Dallas Chaparrals--one of the eleven charter franchises of the American Basketball Association (ABA). During the 1970–71 season, in an attempt to make the team a regional one, the franchise renamed itself the Texas Chaparrals; also, some home games were played in Fort Worth and Lubbock. However, low attendance figures prompted the team to return full-time to Dallas the following season. In 1973, the franchise relocated to San Antonio and was renamed the San Antonio Spurs. Three years later, the Spurs were one of four ABA franchises that joined the NBA as a result of the ABA–NBA merger.

In 45 seasons since joining the NBA, the Spurs have achieved a winning record 36 times, have appeared in the NBA playoffs 38 times, and have won five NBA Championships. The team won its most recent NBA championship in 2014. The only NBA franchises that have won more championships than the Spurs are the Boston Celtics (17 championships), the Los Angeles Lakers (17), the Golden State Warriors (7), and the Chicago Bulls (6).

As of the end of the 2020–21 season, the Spurs owned the NBA's all-time best win percentage; the team had won 62.2 percent of its games since joining the NBA, placing it ahead of the Minneapolis/Los Angeles Lakers (.593), the Boston Celtics (.590), the Seattle SuperSonics/Oklahoma City Thunder (.541), and the Utah Jazz (.539). The 2017–18 season is the first time the Spurs have won less than 50 games in a non-lockout season since the 1996–97 season. This was the longest such streak in the NBA. The 2019–20 season was the first season since the 1996–97 season in which the Spurs missed the playoffs, an NBA record. The Spurs missed out on the playoffs again the following year, marking the first time in franchise history that the Spurs went consecutive seasons without making the playoffs.

Table key

Seasons

Statistics
Statistics are correct as of the end of the 2022 NBA playoffs.

Notes

References

 
seasons